Rhomaleodus is an extinct genus of basal selachimorph elasmobranchii cartilaginous fish known from the Middle Triassic (Anisian stage) of Bulgaria. It was first named by Plamen S. Andreev and Gilles Cuny in 2012 and the type species is Rhomaleodus budurovi.

References

Fossil taxa described in 2012
Triassic fish of Europe
Triassic sharks
Anisian life